The Spirit of '67 is an album by American jazz clarinetist Pee Wee Russell and composer/arranger Oliver Nelson featuring performances recorded in 1967 for the Impulse! label.

Reception
The Allmusic review by Scott Yanow awarded the album 4 stars stating "In general, the charts are colorful and complement Russell well during what would be his swansong".

Track listing
 "Love Is Just Around the Corner" (Louis Gensler, Leo Robin) - 2:50
 "This Is It" (Pee Wee Russell) - 2:18
 "Memories Of You" (Andy Razaf, Eubie Blake) - 3:12
 "Pee Wee's Blues" (Pee Wee Russell) - 3:51
 "The Shadow Of Your Smile" (Johnny Mandel, Paul Francis Webster) - 2:28
 "Ja-Da" (Bob Carleton) - 3:46
 "A Good Man Is Hard to Find" (Harry Saville) - 2:55
 "Bopol" (Oliver Nelson) - 2:58
 "I'm Coming Virginia" (Donald Heywood, Will Marion Cook) - 4:19
 "Six and Four" (Nelson) - 3:39

Recorded on February 14 (#2-6) and February 15, 1967 (#1, 7-10).

Personnel
Tracks 2-6
Pee Wee Russell - clarinet
Oliver Nelson - arranger, conductor
Clark Terry, Joe Wilder, Ed Williams, Snooky Young - trumpet
Jimmy Cleveland, Urbie Green, Dick Hixson - trombone
Tony Studd - bass trombone
Phil Woods, Jerry Dodgion - alto saxophone
Frank Wess, Bob Ashton - tenor saxophone
Danny Bank - baritone saxophone, bass clarinet
Hank Jones - piano
Howard Collins - guitar
George Duvivier - bass
Grady Tate - drums

Tracks 1, 7-10
Pee Wee Russell - clarinet
Oliver Nelson - arranger, conductor
John Frosk, Thad Jones, Jimmy Nottingham, Marvin Stamm - trumpet
Tom McIntosh, Tom Mitchell, Paul Faulise - trombone
Phil Woods - alto saxophone
Jerry Dodgion - alto saxophone, flute
Bob Ashton - tenor saxophone
Seldon Powell - tenor saxophone, flute
Gene Allen - baritone saxophone
Patti Bown - piano
Howard Collins - guitar
George Duvivier - bass
Grady Tate - drums

References

Impulse! Records albums
Pee Wee Russell albums
Oliver Nelson albums
1967 albums
Albums produced by Bob Thiele
Albums conducted by Oliver Nelson
Albums arranged by Oliver Nelson
Instrumental albums